Lewis Roberts, better known by the stage name  Koreless, is a British electronic musician and recording artist. He released his debut album, Agor, in 2021.

History
Roberts was born in Wales and spends the majority of his time in Glasgow.

In 2011, Koreless released his debut EP, 4D, on Pictures Music as a limited edition 12-inch single. In July 2012, he released single "Lost In Tokyo" on Jacques Greene's record label, Vase Records. He was invited to participate in the 2012 Red Bull Music Academy Summit in New York City.

Koreless worked with London-based producer and vocalist Sampha in 2012 to form collaborative works under the name of Short Stories. The pair premiered their track "Let It Go" in a short DJ set for Boiler Room TV in December of that year. This was released with second track, "On The Way", in January 2013 on Young Turks (now known simply as Young).

Koreless' second EP, Yügen, was released in 2013 on Young Turks. The original EP announcement was accompanied by the release of supporting single, "Sun". Another track from this EP, "Never", was featured in director Jason Reitman's 2014 film, Men, Women & Children.

In December 2013, Koreless officially signed to Young Turks. He later appeared on a track from labelmate SBTRKT's second studio album, Wonder Where We Land.

Live
After signing for Young Turks, Koreless was featured in a label showcase on BBC Radio 1 broadcast live at Maida Vale Studios in London with a live string quartet. During January 2014, Koreless supported Scottish band Mogwai during UK dates at the Royal Festival Hall at the Southbank Centre in London. Koreless performed his set with a string trio composed of double bass, cello and violin. Koreless had his live Australian debut in May 2014 as part of a line up for Sydney record label Future Classic's now yearly studio party at Sydney's Vivid Festival.

He supported Caribou on his 2015 European and North American live tour. On 9 April 2015, Koreless played alongside fellow electronic artists and composers James Holden and Luke Abbott in a show at the Barbican Centre to pay homage to the work and influence of electronic pioneer and minimalist composer Terry Riley.

Discography

Albums 
 Agor (2021)

EPs 
 4D (2011)
 Yügen (2013)

Singles 
 "Up Down Up Down" (2011)
 "Lost in Tokyo" (2012)
 "On the Way / Let It Go" (2013 as Short Stories with Sampha)
 "Sun" (2013)
 "TT / Love" (2015)
 "Black Rainbow / Moonlight" (2021)

Production discography and credits

References

External links

1991 births
Living people
Musicians from Glasgow
Welsh electronic musicians
People from Bangor, Gwynedd